Arévalos is a Spanish surname. Notable people with the surname include:

 Lourdes Arévalos (born 1984), Paraguayan model
 Myriam Arévalos (born 1993), Paraguayan model
 Pedro Arévalos (?–1572), Spanish bishop

Spanish-language surnames